The 2001 North Texas Mean Green football team represented the University of North Texas in the 2001 NCAA Division I-A football season. The Mean Green played their home games at the Fouts Field in Denton, Texas, and competed in the newly formed Sun Belt Conference. They were led by fourth-year head coach Darrell Dickey. The team finished their regular season 5–6 overall; in Sun Belt play they were 5–1, tied for first place with Middle Tennessee.

North Texas entered the New Orleans Bowl with a losing record of 5–6, which would usually not be considered bowl-eligible; they were able to play in a bowl game by being co-champions of their conference. Previously, the most recent bowl appearance by a team with a losing record had been William & Mary in the 1970 Tangerine Bowl. The Mean Green lost the New Orleans Bowl to Colorado State, finishing the season with an overall mark of 5–7.

Previous season
In 2000, North Texas compiled a 3–8 record (1–4 in conference play) during the regular season, failing to qualify for a bowl game for the 41st straight season.

Schedule

Schedule source: Homecoming source:

Roster

References

North Texas
North Texas Mean Green football seasons
Sun Belt Conference football champion seasons
North Texas Mean Green football